De Borgia is a census-designated place (CDP) in Mineral County, Montana, United States. The population was 69 at the 2000 census.

The town was named for the nearby river, which was named after Saint Regis DeBorgia, a Catholic missionary. The post office was established in 1900.

Geography
De Borgia is located at  (47.373509, -115.340596). It is located on Interstate 90 with access via exit 18. The St. Regis River flows to the south.

Climate
This climatic region is typified by large seasonal temperature differences, with warm to hot (and often humid) summers and cold (sometimes severely cold) winters.  According to the Köppen Climate Classification system, De Borgia has a humid continental climate, abbreviated "Dfb" on climate maps.

Demographics

As of the census of 2000, there were 69 people, 34 households, and 24 families residing in the CDP. The population density was 12.1 people per square mile (4.7/km2). There were 42 housing units at an average density of 7.4 per square mile (2.8/km2). The racial makeup of the CDP was 95.65% White, and 4.35% from two or more races.

There were 34 households, out of which 11.8% had children under the age of 18 living with them, 64.7% were married couples living together, and 29.4% were non-families. 26.5% of all households were made up of individuals, and 8.8% had someone living alone who was 65 years of age or older. The average household size was 2.03 and the average family size was 2.33.

In the CDP, the population was spread out, with 11.6% under the age of 18, 4.3% from 18 to 24, 20.3% from 25 to 44, 27.5% from 45 to 64, and 36.2% who were 65 years of age or older. The median age was 54 years. For every 100 females, there were 109.1 males. For every 100 females age 18 and over, there were 117.9 males.

The median income for a household in the CDP was $22,917, and the median income for a family was $27,857. Males had a median income of $10,000 versus $0 for females. The per capita income for the CDP was $12,791. There were 9.1% of families and 19.7% of the population living below the poverty line, including no under eighteens and 8.3% of those over 64.

References

Census-designated places in Mineral County, Montana
Census-designated places in Montana